Khawaja Shamsuddin Khawafi was Emperor Akbar's minister and superintendent of construction. His shrine named Hakimon ka Maqbara is located in Hasan Abdal, in Attock District.

He built the fish pond and the tomb Gurdwara Panja Sahib between 1581 and 1583 AD on orders of Akbar.

Attock Fort was also built between 1581 and 1583 under his supervision to protect the passage of the Indus.

Khawaja Shamsuddin whom Pinheiro calls Xamardin (Vide the extract from his letter of r605 quoted in note 6, ch. XIX). Shamsuddin was appointed to the Punjab when Akbar set out for the Deccan in 1598. He died at Lahore in 1600.

He is said to have been a man "of simple manners, honest and faithful, and practical in transacting business" He was succeeded in his office by Zain Khan Koka.

Renowned village Shamsabad opposite to Kamra the PAF base was developed by Khawaja Shamsuddin Khawafi in the 1580s.

References

Attock District
Mughal Empire people
1600 deaths